Candy is a 1985 album by jazz trumpeter Chet Baker, released by Swedish company Sonet Records. It was recorded in a lounge at the Sonet studio at Lidingö.

Track listing

Side A
 "Love for Sale" (Cole Porter) – 9:50
 "Nardis" (Miles Davis) – 5:16
 "Candy" (Mack David, Alex Kramer, Joan Whitney) – 5:04

Side B
 "Bye Bye Blackbird" (Mort Dixon, Ray Henderson) – 7:47
 "Sad Walk" (Bob Zieff) – 4:47
 "Tempus Fugit" (Bud Powell) – 4:20
 "Red's Blues" (Sidney D. Mitchell) – 4:12

Personnel
Chet Baker – trumpet, vocals
Michel Graillier – piano
Jean-Louis Rassinfosse – double bass

References

Chet Baker albums
1985 albums
Sonet Records albums